The SO postcode area, also known as the Southampton postcode area, is a group of 23 postcode districts in southern England, within nine post towns. These cover south and central Hampshire, including  Southampton, Winchester, Alresford, Brockenhurst, Eastleigh, Lymington, Lyndhurst, Romsey and Stockbridge.

The SO area originally had both single and double-digit postcode districts. From the inception of postcodes in Southampton, "large users" within the SO1 and SO2 postcode areas (which broadly covered the area of the city) were allocated SO9 postcodes. In the early 1990s, a shortage of available postcodes occurred due to increased demand. On 1 December 1993 Royal Mail took the step of dividing each of the existing single-digit districts, the numbers of the new subdivisions containing two digits rather than one. For example, the SO1 and SO2 districts were divided into SO14-19. At the same time, ordinary "geographical" postcodes replaced the SO9 codes. Whilst this created thousands more possible postcode combinations, it resulted in the unusual situation where the centre of the postcode area, Southampton, lacks a district numbered 1. The area is one of only a few in the country where this is the case.



Coverage
The approximate coverage of the postcode districts:

|-
! SO14
| SOUTHAMPTON
| City Centre, St. Mary's, Newtown, Nicholstown, Northam, Ocean Village, Chapel, Eastern Docks, Bevois Valley
| Southampton
|-
! SO15
| SOUTHAMPTON
| Shirley, Freemantle, Regents Park, Banister Park, Polygon, Millbrook, Redbridge
| Southampton
|-
! SO16
| SOUTHAMPTON
| Bassett, Lordswood, Lordshill, Redbridge, Rownhams, Nursling, Chilworth, Shirley Warren
| Southampton, Test Valley
|-
! SO17
| SOUTHAMPTON
| Highfield, Portswood, St Denys, Swaythling
| Southampton
|-
! SO18
| SOUTHAMPTON
| Bitterne, Bitterne Park, Harefield, Townhill Park, Chartwell Green, Mansbridge, Southampton Airport
| Eastleigh, Southampton
|-
! SO19
| SOUTHAMPTON
| Sholing, Merry Oak, Thornhill, Woolston, Weston
| Southampton
|-
! SO20
| STOCKBRIDGE
| Stockbridge,  King's Somborne, Middle Wallop
| Test Valley
|-
! SO21
| WINCHESTER
| Compton, Colden Common, Easton, Hursley, Itchen Abbas, Martyr Worthy, Micheldever, Owslebury, Shawford, South Wonston, Sutton Scotney, Sparsholt, Twyford
| Winchester
|-
! SO22
| WINCHESTER
| Badger Farm, Fulflood, Hursley, Littleton and Harestock, Olivers Battery, Pitt, St Cross (W), Stanmore, Weeke
| Winchester
|-
! SO23
| WINCHESTER
| City Centre, Abbotts Barton, Bar End, Highcliffe, Hyde, St Cross (E), Winnall
| Winchester
|-
! SO24
| ALRESFORD
| New Alresford, Old Alresford, Cheriton, Tichborne, Ropley
| Winchester
|-
! style="background:#FFFFFF;"|SO25
| style="background:#FFFFFF;"|WINCHESTER
| style="background:#FFFFFF;"|Bulk users
| style="background:#FFFFFF;"|non-geographic
|-
! SO30
| SOUTHAMPTON
| Botley, Hedge End, West End, Curbridge
| Eastleigh, Winchester
|-
! SO31
| SOUTHAMPTON
| Warsash, Hamble-le-Rice, Locks Heath Netley Abbey
| Eastleigh, Fareham
|-
! SO32
| SOUTHAMPTON
| Bishop's Waltham, Corhampton, Curdridge, Droxford, Durley, Exton, Meonstoke, Shedfield, Soberton, Swanmore, Upham, Warnford, Wickham
| Eastleigh, Winchester
|-
!rowspan=2|SO40
| SOUTHAMPTON
| Totton, Cadnam, Marchwood
|rowspan=2|New Forest
|-
| LYNDHURST
| Lyndhurst
|-
! SO41
| LYMINGTON
| Lymington, Milford-on-Sea, Pennington, Boldre, Hordle, Sway
| New Forest
|-
! SO42
| BROCKENHURST
| Beaulieu, Brockenhurst, East Boldre
| New Forest
|-
! SO43
| LYNDHURST
| Lyndhurst, Minstead, Bramshaw
| New Forest
|-
! SO45
| SOUTHAMPTON
| Hythe, Fawley, Blackfield, Calshot, Hardley
| New Forest
|-
! SO50
| EASTLEIGH
| Town Centre, Boyatt Wood, Fair Oak, Bishopstoke, Horton Heath
| Eastleigh
|-
! SO51
| ROMSEY
| Romsey, Ampfield, Lockerley, Mottisfont, Wellow
| Test Valley
|-
! SO52
| SOUTHAMPTON
| North Baddesley
| Test Valley
|-
! SO53
| EASTLEIGH
| Chandler's Ford
| Eastleigh, Test Valley
|-
! style="background:#FFFFFF;"|SO97
| style="background:#FFFFFF;"|SOUTHAMPTON
| style="background:#FFFFFF;"|Jobcentre Plus
| style="background:#FFFFFF;"|non-geographic
|}

Map

See also
Postcode Address File
List of postcode areas in the United Kingdom

References

External links
Royal Mail's Postcode Address File
A quick introduction to Royal Mail's Postcode Address File (PAF)

Postcode areas covering South East England